Lewin's honeyeater (Meliphaga lewinii) is a bird that inhabits the ranges along the east coast of Australia. It has a semicircular ear-patch, pale yellow in colour.

The name of this bird commemorates the Australian artist John Lewin.

Description

The Lewin's honeyeater is small to medium in size . It is dark greenish-grey in colour, with a creamy yellow gape (i.e., the fleshy corners of the mouth). It has large, yellowish, crescent-shaped ear-patches, which distinguish it from other honeyeaters, apart from two similar, but smaller, species in tropical Queensland. In flight, the pale yellow edges of the flight feathers can be seen. The bill is black and the eye is blue-grey. Both sexes are similar in appearance. Young Lewin's honeyeaters are similar to the adults, but have brown eyes. The strong 'machine gun-like' rattling notes of Lewin's honeyeater are heard over long distances, and reveal its presence in an area.

Body size, voice, and the shape and size of the ear-patch help in identifying the similar Graceful and Yellow-spotted Honeyeaters in tropical Queensland.

Distribution and habitat

The Lewin's honeyeater prefers the wetter parts of eastern Australia, from northern Queensland to central Victoria. It is found in both rainforest and wet sclerophyll forest, and often wanders into more open woodland. It is a common bird, and its call is often heard in these areas. It is a rather sedentary species, tending to stay in the same area all year round, although some altitudinal migration, to lower elevations in the cooler winter months, occurs.

Diet
Lewin's honeyeaters feed mostly on fruits, favouring berries and small fruits, but also eat insects and nectar. Birds are normally seen alone, but may form loose groups of up to 10 birds. They feed in the upper branches and on the trunks of trees. Some insects are caught in flight.

Breeding
Lewin's honeyeaters breed during September to January. The nest is a large cup of vegetation and other materials, bound together with spider web, and lined with soft material. The two to three oval eggs are incubated for about 14 days, and the young birds leave the nest after a further 14 days. It is unclear what roles each parent performs in nest building and incubation, but both care for the young birds.

Gallery

References

 Longmore, N.W. 1991. The Honeyeaters & their Allies of Australia. Angus and Robertson and the National Photographic Index of Australian Wildlife, Sydney.
 Pizzey, G. & Knight, F. 1997. Field Guide to the Birds of Australia. Angus and Robertson, Sydney.
 Schodde, R. & Mason, I. 1999. The Directory of Australian Birds: Passerines. CSIRO Publishing, Collingwood, Victoria.
 Schodde, R. & Tidemann, S.C. (eds) 1990. Reader's Digest Complete Book of Australian Birds (2nd Edition). Reader's Digest (Australia) Pty Ltd., Sydney.

External links
Photos, audio and video of Lewin's honeyeater from Cornell Lab of Ornithology's Macaulay Library

Lewin's honeyeater
Birds of Queensland
Birds of New South Wales
Birds of Victoria (Australia)
Endemic birds of Australia
Lewin's honeyeater
Articles containing video clips